The Cow Who Sang a Song Into the Future (Spanish: La vaca que cantó una canción hacia el futuro) is a 2022 internationally co-produced drama film directed by Francisca Alegría and written by Alegría, Manuela Infante & Fernanda Urrejola. It premiered at the Sundance Film Festival in late January 2022.

Synopsis 
Fish are dying in Chile's rivers due to water pollution caused by human activity. Their lifeless bodies are being dragged ashore along the banks of the Cruces River. In the middle of the river, a woman named Magdalena emerges from the depths, gasping for air. She had been left for dead many years ago.

Upon returning to her family's dairy farm, her husband Enrique suffers a heart attack upon seeing her. His daughter Cecilia then returns home with her two children to take care of him. All the people who Magdalena thought were dead behave very strangely, and their presence also appears to affect electrical appliances.

Cast 

 Mía Maestro as Magdalena
 Alfredo Castro as Enrique
 Leonor Varela as Cecilia
 Marcial Tagle as Bernardo
 Enzo Ferrada as Tomás

Production 
The film was shown for the first time on January 23, 2022 at the Sundance Film Festival. It was screened at the San Francisco International Film Festival at the end of April 2022. It was presented at the Guadalajara International Film Festival in June 2022 and at the International Film Festival Fantasy Film from mid-July 2022. Screened at the Melbourne International Film Festival in August 2022.

Reception 
On Rotten Tomatoes, the film has a maximum approval rating of 100% with an average rating of 6.8 out of 7.

In her review, Caitlin Quinlan of the film magazine Little White Lies describes the film as a folkloric meditation on the relationship between humans and the environment, mother and child. Francisca Alegría's film has a mystical quality and moves fluidly through its minimalist plot. The characters stumble into dreamlike settings through a vision of a world in which they expect to live. If Magdalena's return coincides with the decline of the habitat and thus positions her as a kind of eco-prophet, this can also be understood as an allegory for Mother Earth. Even in its abstraction, The Cow Who Sang a Song Into the Future is a curious film that encourages introspection and offers a hopeful vision for collective healing.

Awards 
Cleveland International Film Festival 2022

 Nominated in the New Direction Competition (Francisca Alegría)

International Film Festival in Guadalajara 2022

 Nomination in the Ibero-American Feature Film Competition

Munich Film Festival 2022

 Nomination in the CineRebels contest (Francisca Alegría)

Luxembourg City Film Festival 2022

 Nomination in the Official Competition

Melbourne International Film Festival 2022

 Nomination in the Bright Horizons Contest

Miami Film Festival 2022

 Knight Marimbas Award Nomination

Neuchatel International Fantastic Film Festival 2022

 Nomination in the international competition

San Francisco International Film Festival 2022

 Nomination in the Latino Film Competition

References

External links 

 

2022 films
2022 drama films
Chilean drama films
French drama films
American drama films
German drama films
2020s Spanish-language films
2020s French films
2020s American films
2020s German films
Films set in Chile
Films shot in Chile